George Brookshaw (c. 1751–1823), also known as G. Brown, was a  notable English painter and illustrator from London.

His early career was spent as a London cabinet-maker specializing in painted furniture, often with floral decorations. Brookshaw also published supplementary drawing manuals on fruit, flowers, and birds. His books included A New Treatise on Flower Painting, or, Every Lady Her Own Drawing Master in 1818.

References

External links
 Brookshaw's Groups of fruit: accurately drawn and coloured after nature…
 Brookshaw's Groups of flowers: drawn and accurately coloured after nature…
 Brookshaw's Six birds, accurately drawn and coloured after nature…

English illustrators
1751 births
1823 deaths
18th-century English painters
English male painters
19th-century English painters
19th-century English male artists
18th-century English male artists